The  is a major river in the western part of Tottori Prefecture. The Hino River emerges from the Chūgoku Mountains. At Kofu, the river turns north-northwest. The lower part of the Hino River flows through the Yonago Plain before finally discharging into Miho Bay at Hiezu near Yonago. Erosion over time has created the scenic Sekkakei Ravine. The Sukesawa Dam forms an artificial lake, Lake Nichinan. Approximately 60,800 people use the water provided by the Hino River.

Tributaries

 - 
 -

References

Rivers of Tottori Prefecture
Rivers of Japan